is a junction passenger railway station located in the city of Tsuyama, Okayama Prefecture, Japan, operated by West Japan Railway Company (JR West).

Lines
Tsuyama Station is served by the  Kishin Line and Tsuyama Line. Train of the Inbi Line normally continue past the nominal terminus of the line at  using the tracks of the Tsuyama Line to terminate at Tsuyama Station.

Station layout
The station consists of two ground-level island platforms connected to the station building by an underground passage. The station has a Midori no Madoguchi staffed ticket office.

History
Tsuyama Station opened on 21 August 1923. With the privatization of Japanese National Railways (JNR) on 1 April 1987, the station came under the control of JR West.

Passenger statistics
In fiscal 2019, the station was used by an average of 1973 passengers daily..

Surrounding area
Tsuyama Castle Ruins (Tsuruyama Park)
 Japan National Route 181

See also
List of railway stations in Japan

References

External links

  Tsuyama Station Official Site

Railway stations in Okayama Prefecture
Kishin Line
Tsuyama Line
Railway stations in Japan opened in 1923
Tsuyama